Malu is a rural locality in the Toowoomba Region, Queensland, Australia. In the  Malu had a population of 18 people.

Geography 
The Western railway line forms the south-west boundary of the locality. Malu railway station is on the boundary of the localities of Malu and Jondaryan.

The land use is a mixture of cropping and grazing on native vegetation.

History
In the  Malu had a population of 18 people.

References 

Toowoomba Region
Localities in Queensland